Lytocarpia is a genus of hydrozoans belonging to the family Aglaopheniidae.

The genus has cosmopolitan distribution.

Species

Species:

Lytocarpia acuta 
Lytocarpia alata 
Lytocarpia angulosa

References

Aglaopheniidae
Hydrozoan genera